Australoonops is a genus of spiders in the family Oonopidae. It was first described in 1915 by Hewitt. , it contains 3 South African species.

References

Oonopidae
Araneomorphae genera
Spiders of South Africa